Ezequiel Adrián Gallegos (born 16 April 1991) is an Argentine professional footballer who plays as a midfielder for Primera Nacional club Temperley.

Career
Gallegos' career began with Huracán. He made his professional debut on 18 September 2011 in a Primera B Nacional match with Independiente Rivadavia, having previously been an unused substitute versus Independiente in December 2010. After six further appearances in 2011–12 and 2012–13, Gallegos left the club on loan in January 2013 to join Malaysian Premier League side Johor Darul Ta'zim II. However, he returned to Huracán six months later without featuring. Three years later, Gallegos left again on loan to play for Almagro in Primera B Nacional. Forty-six appearances and one goal followed.

On 25 July 2017, Gallegos left Huracán permanently after signing for Primera B Metropolitana team Platense. His debut for Platense arrived on 2 September against Defensores de Belgrano. Overall, Gallegos scored once in twenty-one matches as the club won the 2017–18 Primera B Metropolitana title.

Career statistics
.

Honours
Huracán
Copa Argentina: 2013–14
Supercopa Argentina: 2014

Platense
Primera B Metropolitana: 2017–18

References

External links

1991 births
Living people
Argentine footballers
Argentine expatriate footballers
People from La Matanza Partido
Association football midfielders
Argentine Primera División players
Super League Greece 2 players
Primera Nacional players
Malaysia Premier League players
Primera B Metropolitana players
Club Atlético Huracán footballers
Johor Darul Ta'zim II F.C. players
Club Almagro players
Club Atlético Platense footballers
Gimnasia y Esgrima de Jujuy footballers
Club Atlético Temperley footballers
Almopos Aridea F.C. players
Expatriate footballers in Malaysia
Expatriate footballers in Greece
Argentine expatriate sportspeople in Malaysia
Argentine expatriate sportspeople in Greece

Sportspeople from Buenos Aires Province